Fat Albert Rotunda is the eighth album by jazz keyboardist Herbie Hancock, released in 1969.  It was Hancock's first release for Warner Bros. Records after his departure from Blue Note Records. The music was originally done for the TV special Hey, Hey, Hey, It's Fat Albert, which later inspired the Fat Albert and the Cosby Kids TV show.

Fat Albert Rotunda and the two albums that followed it, Mwandishi and Crossings, were reissued in one set as Mwandishi: The Complete Warner Bros. Recordings in 1994 and as The Warner Bros. Years (1969-1972) in 2014.

Musicians and style
On this album Hancock changes to a jazz-funk style with a playful 1960s R&B flavor, to fit the cartoon theme. He would not return to this style again until four years later with Head Hunters (1973).

Hancock recorded the album in two sessions, with two different groups of musicians. Five songs were played by tenor saxophonist Joe Henderson (mostly playing flutes), trombonist  Garnett Brown and trumpeter Johnny Coles, bassist Buster Williams and drummer Albert "Tootie" Heath. The opening and closing tracks were played by trumpeters Joe Newman and Ernie Royal, saxophonists Joe Farrell and Art Clarke, trombonist Benny Powell, guitarists Eric Gale and Billy Butler, bassist Jerry Jemmott, and drummer Bernard Purdie. The various musician solos include Hancock playing on Fender Rhodes electric piano.

Track listing

All songs composed by Herbie Hancock. (Copyright Hancock Music Company-BMI)

Personnel
Herbie Hancock — piano, electric piano
Joe Henderson — tenor saxophone, flute, alto flute
Garnett Brown — trombone
Johnny Coles — trumpet, flugelhorn
Buster Williams — electric and acoustic bass
Albert "Tootie" Heath  — drums 
Joe Newman, Ernie Royal — trumpets (tracks 1 & 7, uncredited in original LP release)
Joe Farrell — tenor saxophone, alto saxophone (tracks 1 & 7, uncredited in original LP release)
Art Clarke - baritone saxophone (tracks 1 & 7, uncredited in original LP release)
Benny Powell - trombone (tracks 1 & 7, uncredited in original LP release)
Eric Gale, Billy Butler — guitar (tracks 1 & 7, uncredited in original LP release)
Jerry Jemmott – electric bass (tracks 1 & 7, uncredited in original LP release)
Bernard Purdie – drums (tracks 1 & 7, uncredited in original LP release)

Production
Arranged and conducted by Herbie Hancock
Produced by Herbie Hancock
Recorded and engineered by Rudy Van Gelder

References

External links

Herbie Hancock albums
1970 albums
Warner Records albums
Albums conducted by Herbie Hancock
Albums arranged by Herbie Hancock
Instrumental albums
Albums recorded at Van Gelder Studio
Albums produced by Herbie Hancock